Ning Feng (宁峰, born 1982) is a Chinese violinist. He was born in Chengdu, China, and is based in Berlin.

Career

Ning Feng started playing the violin at a very young age and shortly after his fourth birthday he began lessons with Hu Weimin, at the Sichuan Conservatory of Music. He later went to London, England, to study at the Royal Academy of Music, and his teacher there, Hu Kun, was the son of his first teacher. He was the first student to ever receive a 100% grade for his final recital.

After that, he studied with Antje Weithaas in Berlin, at the Hanns Eisler School of Music. He went on to win prizes at the Hannover International Violin Competition, Queen Elisabeth Competition, and Yehudi Menuhin International Competition for Young Violinists, and was First Prize winner of the 2005 Michael Hill International Violin Competition (New Zealand). In 2006 he was awarded first prize in the Paganini Competition.

In 2012, he founded the Dragon Quartet, in which he plays first violin, and he performs regularly with this ensemble, as well as with major local and international orchestras.

Ning Feng plays a 1710 Stradivarius violin, known as the "Vieuxtemps Hauser", on private loan, kindly arranged by Premiere Performances of Hong Kong and plays on strings by Thomastik-Infeld, Vienna.

He has performed as a soloist with many internationally known orchestras, including the Budapest Festival Orchestra, Hong Kong Philharmonic, Los Angeles Philharmonic, the Frankfurt Radio Symphony, the Royal Philharmonic, the City of Birmingham Symphony Orchestra, the China Philharmonic, the Royal Scottish National Orchestra, and others. He has worked with Iván Fischer, Jaap van Zweden, Mirga Gražinytė-Tyla, Yu Long, Vasily Petrenko, Yeruham Scharovsky, and many other conductors.

He is actively involved in education as well as performing. He holds the post of Violin Tutor at Hochschule für Musik "Hanns Eisler", Berlin, is Guest Professor at the Central Conservatory of Music, Beijing, and teaches at the Royal Northern College of Music in Manchester, UK.

Recordings 

Ning Feng records for Channel Classics Records, and has notably recorded Bach's Sonatas and Partitas for solo violin, in the first recording by a Chinese violinist, violin concertos by Bruch and Tchaikovsky, and two CDs of solo violin works by Bartók, Prokofiev, and Hindemith, and by Milstein, Berio, Paganini, and others.

References

External links
 
 Ning Feng, Intermusica

1982 births
Chinese violinists
Living people
Musicians from Chengdu
21st-century violinists